Chu Chu, ChuChu, or Chu-Chu can refer to the following things:

 ChuChu (The Legend of Zelda), a type of monster from The Legend of Zelda video game series
 Chu-Chu, a character from Xenogears
 A type of mouse from ChuChu Rocket!
 Chuchu (magazine), a Japanese shōjo manga magazine
 ChuChu, a character from the Kirby video game series
 Ch'uch'u, also spelled Chuchu, a mountain in Bolivia
 Chuchu, a pikachu kept by Yellow in Pokémon Adventures
 Chayote, a vegetable known in Brazil as chuchu
 ChuChu TV, a popular channel on YouTube for children
 Jim Chuchu, a Kenyan film director, photographer, singer-songwriter and visual artist